Wattener Sportgemeinschaft Tirol , commonly known as WSG Tirol, is a professional association football club based in the town of Wattens, Tyrol, Austria, that competes in the Austrian Football Bundesliga, the top tier of the Austrian football league system. Founded in 1930, it is affiliated to the Tirol Football Association. The team plays its home matches at Tivoli Stadion Tirol, where it has been based since 2019. In the 1969–70 season they played in the Nationalliga, the highest division in Austrian football at this time.

History 
The club was formed in 1930 and has been known as SC Wattens (1930–53), SV Wattens (1953–71), and WSG Wattens (1984–2019). Its most successful period was in 1968–71, when it competed in the Austrian Bundesliga. Between 1971 and 1984 it merged with FC Wacker Innsbruck to form SSW Innsbruck (the merged team went on to win the Bundesliga five times and reached the quarter finals of the 1977-78 European Cup). In this period the club retained its identity with distinct youth teams. From 1984, WSG Wattens have played in the Austrian Regional League West and the second tier First League. In 2019, they were promoted to the Bundesliga. After promotion, the club announced that their name would be changed to WSG Swarowski Tirol. In 2021 however, Swarovski ended its sponsorship and its name was removed from the club's name as well as from the business.

Stadium 

WSG Tirol play their home matches in Gernot Langes Stadion, Wattens. The stadium's capacity is 5500. The team’s average home attendance for the 2010–11 season was 289.  The stadium is also occasionally used for international matches, such as a 2010 friendly between Saudi Arabia and Nigeria.

In 2013 the stadium was renamed in Gernot Langes stadium in honour of the 70th birthday of the longtime president Gernot Langes.

The stadium does not currently meet Bundesliga suitability criteria and therefore redevelopment work has been planned to create a modern, 6,000 capacity stadium by the summer of 2021. During this period, the club will use the Tivoli Stadium in Innsbruck.

Achievements 

 Austrian Second Division:
 Winners (1): 2018–19
 Austrian Second Division (West):
 Winners (1): 1968
 Austrian Third Division (West):
 Winners (4): 1989, 1995, 1999, 2003, 2016

Current squad

Club Officials

Manager history 

  Fritz Pfister (1964–1970)
  Eduard Frühwirth (1970–1971)
  Hugo Perwein (1989–1990)
  Günther Rinker (1991–1994)
  Friedrich Peer (1994-1997)
  Wolfgang Schwarz (1997-2000)
  Günther Steinlechner (2000–2001)
  Fuad Đulić (2001)
  Michael Streiter (2001-2002)
  Georg Saringer (2005)
  Thomas Pfeiler (2006-2007)
  Klaus Schuster (2007)
  Robert Auer (2007-2008)
  Roland Kirchler (2008-2012)
  Robert Wazinger (2012-2013)
  Thomas Silberberger (2013-)

See also 

 Football in Austria
 Austrian Football First League

References

External links 

Official website
Official facebook

Football clubs in Austria
Association football clubs established in 1930
1930 establishments in Austria
Sport in Tyrol (state)
WSG Tirol
Innsbruck-Land District